Mrševci is a village in the Ilinden Municipality of North Macedonia.

Demographics
As of the 2021 census, Mrševci had 547 residents with the following ethnic composition:
Macedonians 395
Serbs 143
Persons for whom data are taken from administrative sources 6
Others 3

According to the 2002 census, the village had a total of 651 inhabitants. Ethnic groups in the village include:
Macedonians 403
Serbs 242
Others 6

References

Villages in Ilinden Municipality